The Tree is an autobiographical book by John Fowles.

In it, Fowles discusses the essence of nature and its relation to the creative arts, especially writing, which he describes as “siblings, branches of the one tree.”

References

1979 non-fiction books
Books about writing
Books by John Fowles
English-language books